This is a listing of notable people who were born in, or have lived in, Chandler, Arizona.

Athletics
 Adam Archuleta – professional football player, Chicago Bears
 Ryan Bader – Mixed martial artist, UFC's Light Heavyweight division
 Clay Bellinger – former professional baseball player 1999-2002 (Yankees & Angels)
 Cody Bellinger – professional baseball player 2017–present (Dodgers)
 Hunter Bishop (born 1998) – baseball player
 Lance Brown –  professional football player
 Melissa Buhl – downhill and mountain-cross cycling champion
 T.J. Clark – NASCAR driver
 Leonard Davis – professional football player, Dallas Cowboys<ref>Jensen, Edythe. Ex-Card lauded for saving horse. 'The Arizona Republic, May 21, 2007. Retrieved March 29, 2008.</ref>
 Chris DeGeare – professional football player
 Louie Espinoza – Arizona's first world champion boxer
 Andre Ethier – professional baseball player, Los Angeles Dodgers.
 Nelson Figueroa – professional baseball player
 Ryan Fitzpatrick – Tampa Bay Buccaneers quarterback
 Zora Folley – heavyweight boxer; Folley Street is named for himLaurean, Julian and Crowner, Jessica. Folley Street. Retrieved February 23, 2008.
 Channing Frye – NBA basketball player, Cleveland Cavaliers.
 Barry Gardner – professional football player
 Mean Joe Greene – professional football player
 Brett Hundley – professional football player, Green Bay Packers
 Mike Leach – professional football player, Arizona Cardinals
 Rodrigo Lopez – professional baseball player, Chicago Cubs
 Tank Johnson – professional football player
 Cameron Jordan – professional football player, New Orleans Saints
 Dion Jordan – professional football player, Seattle Seahawks
 Mike Kruczek – professional football player
 Matt Leinart – professional football player
 Becca Longo – high school football kicker, first woman to receive NCAA football scholarship at Division II or better
 Jeff Malone – professional basketball player 
 Donovan McNabb – professional football quarterback
 Dustin Pedroia – professional baseball player
 Paul Perkins – professional football player, New York Giants
 Keith Poole – professional football player
 Junior Spivey – professional baseball player
 Dernell Stenson – professional baseball player
 Terrell Suggs – professional football player, Baltimore Ravens
 Lindsay Taylor – WNBA player, Seattle Storm
 Brian Urlacher – professional football player, Chicago Bears
 Greg Vanney – MLS player, D.C. United
 Markus Wheaton – professional football player, Pittsburgh Steelers
 Ken Whisenhunt – professional football player and coach
 AQ Shipley – professional football player, Arizona Cardinals
 Andy Lane – professional baseball player and coach, Chicago Cubs</ref>
 Robbie Gould – professional football player, San Francisco 49ers

Literature
 Bill Konigsberg – award-winning author
 Dary Matera – author, columnist
 Alberto Ríos – poet, writer, academic

Movies/television/media
 Alexa Havins – actress, All My Children''
 Ice-T – actor and rapper, part-time resident
 Shawn Michaels – professional wrestler, WWE
 James Rallison – famous YouTuber, artist, and animator, better known as TheOdd1sOut
 Liz Renay – actress, gangster's moll
Jose Rosete - actor, best known for The Walking Dead: Red Machete

Music/arts
 Antony Hämäläinen – lead singer, Meridian Dawn and former vocalist of Nightrage
 Waylon Jennings – singer, Country Music Hall of Fame
 Tom Linton – guitarist of Jimmy Eat World
 Kylee Saunders – Japanese-American pop star
 Marcus Orelias - artist, entrepreneur, game designer, and actor.

Politics
 In Tam – Cambodian politician

Miscellaneous
 Eddie Basha, Jr. – businessman, CEO of Bashas'
 Tom Liddy – nationally syndicated conservative talk radio host, attorney
 Brenna Sakas – Miss Arizona USA 2006

References

 
Chandler
Chandler, Arizona